Four Brothers is a jazz standard in AABA format written by Jimmy Giuffre in 1947, based on the chord changes of 'Jeepers Creepers'.  The song was written for the "Four Brothers" saxophone section of Woody Herman's second band, and has since been covered by many groups.

Recordings 
Woody Herman recorded it on December 27, 1947 for Columbia records with his second Herd, which had been organized earlier that year. It features the "Four Brothers" saxophone section of Zoot Sims, Serge Chaloff, Herbie Steward, and Stan Getz, playing in that order.  All four played in the light, almost vibrato-less, style of their idol, Lester Young. The song so typifies the sound of Woody Herman's second Herd that the band is also known as the Four Brothers Band.

Giuffre recorded it in 1955 when it was released on his debut album by Capitol.  He again recorded it in 1958, an album released by Atlantic entitled The Four Brothers Sound. Art Pepper recorded a version of the tune in 1959 which appears on Art Pepper + Eleven – Modern Jazz Classics.

Anita O'Day recorded scat versions of the tune in the 1950s and 1960s, in which she took the place of one of the four saxophone players and scatted with the other three. The King Sisters, also in the 1950s and 1960s, had a version of it.

Marian McPartland also recorded a live version on piano in 1959.

A vocal version was also released by The Manhattan Transfer on their 1978 album Pastiche. This version was based on the arrangement that Lambert, Hendricks and Ross used in the 1950s.

A Hungarian version of the song ('Four Gangsters') was featured in the 1984 animation movie 'Macskafogó' (Cat City).

An a cappella rendition complete with lyrics was recorded by Realtime as the title track of their 2004 CD.

References

See also
List of jazz contrafacts

Grammy Hall of Fame Award recipients
1947 songs
1940s jazz standards
Swing jazz standards